Duochrome is a live album by Dave Cousins. It was originally released as a bonus disc for the first 1000 buyers of the Strawbs album The Broken Hearted Bride through their label's online shop. Popular demand prompted an independent release later that year.

Track listing

All tracks written by Dave Cousins.

"Hanging in the Gallery" (4:39)
"Never Take Sweets from a Stranger" (3:47)
"Song of a Sad Little Girl" (4:49)
"The Hangman and the Papist" (4:08)
"Grace Darling" (5:30)
"Beat the Retreat" (5:03)
"Ringing Down the Years" (6:36)
"The Shepherd's Song" (4:52)
"Ways and Means" (4:24)
"Blue Angel" (10:34)
"We'll Meet Again Sometime" (5:56)
"Beside the Rio Grande" (5:05)

Personnel

Dave Cousins – vocals, acoustic guitar
Ian Cutler – violin (tracks 7 to 11)
Chas Cronk – mastering

Release history

References
link Duochrome on Strawbsweb]

2008 live albums
Dave Cousins albums